The Comet Galaxy, a spiral galaxy located 3.2 billion light-years from Earth, in the galaxy cluster Abell 2667, was found with the Hubble Space Telescope. This galaxy has slightly more mass than our Milky Way. It was detected on 2 March 2007.

Structure
This unique spiral galaxy, which is situated 3.2 billion light-years from the Earth, has an extended stream of bright blue knots and diffuse wisps of young stars. It rushes at 3.5 million km/h through the cluster Abell 2667 and therefore, like a comet, shows a tail, with a length of 600,000 light-years.

Galaxy fate

The Сomet Galaxy is currently being ripped to pieces, moving through a cluster at speeds of greater than 2 million mph.  As the galaxy speeds through, its gas and stars are being stripped away by the tidal forces exerted by the cluster. Also contributing to this destructive process is the pressure of the cluster's hot gas plasma reaching temperatures as high as 100 million degrees. Scientists estimate that the total duration of the transformation process is close to one billion years. What is seen now in the Hubble's image is roughly 200 million years into the process. Even though the Comet Galaxy's mass is slightly greater than the Milky Way, it will lose all its gas and dust, and so not be able to generate stars later in life. It will become a gas-poor galaxy with an old population of red stars.

During the ram pressure stripping process, the charged particles strip and push away the infalling galaxy's gas, just as the solar wind of charged particles pushes ionized gas away from a comet to create a gas tail. For this reason the scientists have nicknamed the stretched spiral the "comet galaxy."

"This unique galaxy, situated 3.2 billion light-years from Earth, has an extended stream of bright blue knots and diffuse wisps of young stars driven away by the tidal forces and the ram pressure stripping of the hot dense gas," said Jean-Paul Kneib, a study collaborator from the Laboratoire d'Astrophysique de Marseille.

The image of the Comet Galaxy by Hubble helped show that huge gravitational interactions between galaxies in massive clusters cause tremendous damage to the structure of a galaxy, and the amount of gas they have. Galaxies near the center of clusters experience the most damage of all, while galaxies at the outskirts are relatively unharmed. The galaxy collisions can distort the shape of galaxies, and even fling out “homeless stars” into intergalactic space.

Even though its mass is slightly larger than that of the Milky Way, the spiral will inevitably lose all its gas and dust as well as its chance of generating new stars later, and become a gas-poor galaxy with an old population of red stars. The finding sheds light on the process by which gas-rich galaxies might evolve into gas-poor galaxies over billions of years. The new observations also reveal one mechanism for forming of “homeless” stars seen scattered throughout galaxy clusters.

The strong gravitational pull exerted by the galaxy cluster's collective mass has bent the light of other, more distant galaxies and distorted their shapes - an effect called gravitational lensing. The giant bright banana-shaped arc seen just to the left of the cluster center corresponds to the magnified and distorted image of a distant galaxy located behind the cluster's core.

See also
 Abell 2667

References

External links
 Comet Galaxy from spacetelescope.org
 Comet Galaxy from arxiv.org

Spiral galaxies
3234374
Sculptor (constellation)
20070302